Broken Sky (original Spanish title: El cielo dividido) is a 2006 Mexican drama film involving a love triangle between three young gay men. The film was directed and written by Julián Hernández.

Plot
The movie revolves around a Gay love story between three young gay students. For Gerardo and Jonas it was love at first sight. Their passion only grew unafraid of displaying their affection in public nor in the school halls. Gerardo is an overly sensitive guy who is hopelessly in love with Jonas, an unpredictable and erratic guy. Jonas hangs out in a club and chats up a random guy, breaking Gerardo's feeble heart. Sergio enters our plot when Gerardo finds himself in this feeble state, seeking solace in his arms. Gerardo seems to be holding on to his old flame and also his new lover Sergio

Cast
 Miguel Ángel Hoppe as Gerardo
 Fernando Arroyo as Jonás
 Alejandro Rojo as Sérgio
 Ignacio Pereda as Bruno
 Klaudia Aragon as Emilia
 Clarissa Rendón as María

References

External links
 
 
 
 

2006 films
2000s Spanish-language films
Mexican LGBT-related films
Films set in Mexico
2006 drama films
LGBT-related drama films
Gay-related films
Mexican drama films
2006 LGBT-related films
2000s Mexican films

ru:Расколотое небо